The 4th Hum Awards ceremony, presented by the Hum Television Network and Entertainment Channel (HTNEC), sponsored by Servis, honored the best in fashion, music and Hum Television Dramas of 2015. It took place on April 23, 2016 at the Expo Centre in Karachi, Sindh, beginning at 7:30 p.m. PST. During the ceremony, HTNEC presented Hum Awards in 25 categories. The ceremony was televised in Pakistan by Hum TV on May 28, 2016.

4th Hum Awards were also selected to air on Hum Europe on Eid al-Adha 2016.

Actors Sanam Jung, Hamza Ali Abbasi, and Ayesha Khan hosted the ceremony, while Ahmed Ali Butt and Vasay Chaudhry emceed the ceremony again. The red carpet pre show was hosted by Rubya Chaudhry and Khalid Malik.

Winners and nominees
Nominees for public voting were announced on April 5, 2016 on ceremony website. Only nine categories were set open for public voting in Viewers Choice Categories with five categories from Television and two categories from Fashion and Music segments, till April 18, 2016.

Winners are listed first and highlighted in boldface.

Television

Music

Fashion

See also
 15th Lux Style Awards
 2nd ARY Film Awards

References

External links

Official websites
 Hum Awards official website
 Hum Awards at Hum Network Limited 
 Hum Television Network and Entertainment Channel (HTNEC)
  (run by the Hum Television Network and Entertainment Channel)

2015 film awards
2015 television awards
2015 music awards
Hum Awards
Hum Awards ceremonies